Piper Lisa Perabo (born October 31, 1976) is an American actress. Following her breakthrough in the comedy-drama film Coyote Ugly (2000), she starred in The Prestige (2006), Angel Has Fallen (2019), and as CIA agent Annie Walker in the USA Network spy drama series Covert Affairs (2010–2014), for which she was nominated for a Golden Globe Award for Best Actress – Television Series Drama.

Early life
Perabo is the daughter of Mary Charlotte (née Ulland), a physical therapist, and George William Perabo, a lecturer in poetry at Ocean County College. She is of English, German, and Irish (father) and Norwegian (mother) descent; her surname is sometimes mistakenly described as Portuguese. She grew up in Toms River, New Jersey.

Perabo's parents named her after actress Piper Laurie. She is the eldest of three children with two brothers, Noah and Adam. She graduated from Toms River High School North in 1994, and earned a bachelor's degree in theater from Honors Tutorial College at Ohio University in 1998. In 1996, she attended the Trinity/La MaMa Performing Arts Program. She also studied Latin, physics, and poetry in her final year.

Perabo was first noticed a year before she graduated from college. She was in New York City, visiting her then-boyfriend, and accompanied him to an audition. Casting director Denise Fitzgerald spotted her and asked her to read for a part. She was not cast, but when Fitzgerald found out that she did not have any representation, she made phone calls on Perabo's behalf and found her an agent.

Career

1997–2007: Beginning and breakthrough
After graduating, Perabo moved to New York, where she worked as a waitress. She also studied acting at the La MaMa Experimental Theatre Club and had roles in various plays. She was cast in her first feature film just a month after moving to the city, Marc Levin's comedy Whiteboyz. In 2000, she was cast in the romantic musical comedy-drama film Coyote Ugly as Violet "Jersey" Sanford, for which she won an MTV Movie Award for Best Music Moment for "One Way or Another". Despite the film's mixed response from critics, it was a box office success, grossing over $113 million worldwide. She also appeared in The Adventures of Rocky and Bullwinkle as FBI agent Karen Sympathy.

After the success of Coyote Ugly, Perabo decided to focus on independent films. In 2001, she starred in an independent Canadian drama called Lost and Delirious, playing a boarding school student who falls in love with a female classmate (played by Jessica Paré). The film was met with mixed reviews, but the performances of Perabo, Paré and co-star Mischa Barton were, however, widely praised. Perabo's performance in particular received critical acclaim, which Loren King of the Chicago Tribune remarked was her "breakout performance". Entertainment Weekly'''s Owen Gleiberman called her "an actress of glittering ferocity" and her performance "a geyser of emotion". Jim Lane of the Sacramento News & Review said that "Perabo is a revelation, wild and fiery — it's a breakthrough performance, astonishing in its fervency" and Roger Ebert praised her performance for its sincerity and "wonderful abandon and conviction".

The next year she starred as a French exchange student in the independent comedy Slap Her... She's French, which was shelved in North America for two years, then released under the new title She Gets What She Wants. The film was released under its original title in Europe. She had a role as the eldest Baker child, Nora, in Cheaper by the Dozen (2003), a role she reprised in the film's 2005 sequel. Her other films include The I Inside (2003), Perfect Opposites (2004), George and the Dragon (2004), The Cave (2005), Imagine Me & You (2005), Edison (2005), and The Prestige (2006).

2008–present: Covert Affairs and other work
In 2008, Perabo co-starred with Jamie Lee Curtis in the family comedy film Beverly Hills Chihuahua. Also that year, she made her off-Broadway debut in the Neil LaBute play Reasons to Be Pretty. As the play's run was coming to an end, she read the script for the USA Network television spy drama series Covert Affairs: "I was reading movie scripts and I wasn't finding anything that was really speaking to me and my agent suggested that I read [the Covert Affairs script]. And I hadn't thought about doing television, but when I read it, it kind of changed everything for me. She's such a powerful character, she's so smart, the action is so intense, and I really thought it would be fun to do."

The following year, Perabo was cast as CIA field agent Annie Walker, the lead character in Covert Affairs. For her work in the series, she received a nomination for the 2010 Golden Globe Award for Best Actress – Television Series Drama. The series ran for five seasons, from 2010 to 2014.

In September 2012, Perabo had a supporting role, alongside Bruce Willis, Joseph Gordon-Levitt, and Emily Blunt, in the time travel thriller film Looper. In December 2012, she was cast in a recurring role on the sitcom Go On. Her character, Simone, was a former member of Matthew Perry's character's support group, who returned and became his love interest. She was originally scheduled to appear in three episodes, but this was increased to four.

Perabo had a starring role in the thriller Into the Grizzly Maze, which was released in 2015. She starred as Julia George in the ABC drama series Notorious (2016). She co-starred with Antonio Banderas in the thriller film Black Butterfly, which was released in May 2017. In June 2018, it was announced that Perabo was cast as Sara in the Netflix comedy series Turn Up Charlie. Also in 2019, she starred as Leah Banning in the action film Angel Has Fallen. In 2020, she had a recurring role as Linda Craft in the Showtime supernatural horror series Penny Dreadful: City of Angels.

Perabo co-starred as Angela in the 2020 dark comedy film, Spontaneous.

In 2021, Perabo joined the cast of Yellowstone as Summer Higgins, an animal rights activist and ally of John (season 4).

Personal life
In 2013, Perabo became engaged to director and writer Stephen Kay; they married on July 26, 2014, in New York City. Perabo is step-mother to Kay's daughter.

Perabo has been close friends with actress Lena Headey since they starred together in the 2005 films The Cave and Imagine Me & You. She speaks fluent French, advocates for LGBT rights and women's political leadership, and serves on the advisory board of VoteRunLead. She is part owner of Employees Only, a Prohibition-themed bar in the West Village, that opened in 2005, and Jack's Wife Freda'', a SoHo restaurant that opened in 2012.

Political activism
Perabo was arrested for protesting Brett Kavanaugh's Supreme Court confirmation hearing.
She was also arrested in November 2019 while attending one of Jane Fonda's weekly climate change protests.

Perabo endorsed Elizabeth Warren in the 2020 Democratic Party presidential primaries and regularly uses her Twitter and Instagram accounts to advocate for voter registration and voter education. She has encouraged followers to seek out VoteRiders to learn more about Voter ID requirements.

Filmography

Film

Television

Stage

Awards and nominations

References

External links

 
 
 

Actresses from New Jersey
Actresses from Dallas
American film actresses
American people of English descent
American people of German descent
American people of Irish descent
American people of Norwegian descent
American stage actresses
American television actresses
American LGBT rights activists
Living people
Ohio University alumni
People from Toms River, New Jersey
Toms River High School North alumni
20th-century American actresses
21st-century American actresses
New Jersey Democrats
1976 births